Michael Jason Rucinski (born March 30, 1975) is an American former professional ice hockey player who played in the National Hockey League for the Carolina Hurricanes.

Early life
Rucinski was born in Trenton, Michigan. As a youth, he played in the 1989 Quebec International Pee-Wee Hockey Tournament with the Detroit Little Caesars minor ice hockey team.

Career 
Rucinski was drafted 217th by the Hartford Whalers (now Carolina Hurricanes) in the 1995 NHL Entry Draft and played 26 regular season games for the Hurricanes scoring two assists and collecting ten penalty minutes. In March 2002, Rucinski was traded to the New Jersey Devils for Ted Drury, but never played a game for the Devils, spending his time in the AHL for the Albany River Rats and retired shortly afterwards.

He spent several years as the director of hockey operations at Suburban Ice Arena in East Lansing. He is currently a senior firefighter in Metro Detroit.

Career statistics

Regular season and playoffs

International

References

External links

1975 births
Albany River Rats players
American men's ice hockey defensemen
Beast of New Haven players
Carolina Hurricanes players
Cincinnati Cyclones (IHL) players
Cleveland Lumberjacks players
Detroit Junior Red Wings players
Detroit Whalers players
Hartford Whalers draft picks
Ice hockey players from Michigan
Living people
Lowell Lock Monsters players
People from Trenton, Michigan
Richmond Renegades players
Springfield Falcons players